Kókómjólk (ChocoMilk) is a popular Icelandic chocolate milk beverage manufactured by Mjólkursamsalan. The beverage used to have a purple and yellow striped female cat mascot named Branda ("bröndótt" being the Icelandic word for brindle), which has now been replaced by Klói, a more muscular male cat, who is portrayed claiming "you will get strength from Kókómjólk."

The mascot's design was changed in 2014 where its body composition was made leaner.

In Icelandic shops, Kókómjólk is also available in a sugar free variation and in a 250ml milk carton.

Every summer there is a game called "Kókómjólkurleikurinn", translated as "The ChocoMilk Game".  In this game, one buys a 6-pack of Kókómjólk cartons, on which there will be a little note with a lucky number. The customer then goes to the Kókómjólk website and checks to see if the lucky number awards any prizes. Prizes could be, for example, a box of Kókómjólk or a ticket to the movies.

Cultural impact 
In the mid-1990s famed Formula Offroad star Gísli Gunnar Jónsson landed a sponsorship with Kókómjólk. His unlimited class vehicle got the kenning "Kókómjólkurbíllinn" and is still an icon of Formula Offroad today.

References

External links

Chocolate drinks
Icelandic cuisine
Icelandic drinks